Beverly Makangila (born 11 April 2000) is a Congolese footballer who plays as a midfielder for Hartford Athletic in the USL Championship.

References

External links
Beverly Makangila at USL Championship

2000 births
Living people
Democratic Republic of the Congo footballers
Democratic Republic of the Congo expatriate footballers
Association football midfielders
San Diego Loyal SC players
USL Championship players
Democratic Republic of the Congo expatriate sportspeople in the United States
Expatriate soccer players in the United States
FC Saint-Éloi Lupopo players
Linafoot players
Colorado Springs Switchbacks FC players
Hartford Athletic players
21st-century Democratic Republic of the Congo people